The Family Roe: An American Story is a 2021 book, written by Joshua Prager.  The book is a biographical account of Norma McCorvey, known as "Jane Roe" in the 1973 landmark U.S. Supreme Court decision Roe v. Wade.  The Roe case, which established a woman's constitutional right to an abortion, is one of the most controversial opinions in American jurisprudence.  The Family Roe was a finalist for the 2022 Pulitzer Prize for General Nonfiction.

Recognition 

 Finalist for the 2022 Pulitzer Prize for General Nonfiction
 Finalist for the 2022 J. Anthony Lukas Book Prize
 Finalist for the 2021 National Book Critics Circle Award for Nonfiction
 NPR's Best Books of 2021
 The New York Times Notable Book of 2021
 TIME magazine's 100 Must-Read Books of 2021

See also 

 2021 in literature
 Shelley Lynn Thornton

References

External links 

 The Epic Life of the Woman Behind Roe v. Wade
 The messy family saga and complicated characters behind Roe v. Wade
 The Realities Of Abortion Politics In 'Family Roe: An American Story' & 'Red Clocks'
 ‘The Family Roe’ Ignores the Elephant
 Our One Fight: A new book tries to bring together “both sides” of the abortion debate. Its timing is terrible.
 The Family Roe and the Messy Reality of the Abortion “Jane Roe” Didn’t Get

2021 non-fiction books
American biographies
W. W. Norton & Company books